Ørnulf Bast (25 January 1907 – 28 October 1974) was a Norwegian sculptor and painter particularly known for his public monuments.

Background
Ørnulf Bjarne Bast was born  in Oslo. His parents were Halsten Andersen Bast Birklund (1870–1952) and Ida Mathilde Kristensen (1870–1960).  Bast studied at the Norwegian National Academy of Fine Arts (Statens kunstakademi) from 1927-30. He made several study trips, first to France from 1928 to 1929 and later to Britain, Germany, Greece, Italy, Spain and North Africa, including Egypt, 1930 and 1932, and a new journey to Paris 1937.

He was married in 1940 to Lajla von Hanno (1921–2010).
During the occupation of Norway by Nazi Germany, Bast and his wife supplied a cover-up apartment for the Norwegian resistance movement, specifically for the staff of the sabotage squad Aks 13000, for some time.

Career
He completed a wide range of public memorials and decorations in a quiet style, characterized by a French-dominated class flight of sculptural tradition. Of note are  Borregaard-monumentet  in Sarpsborg (1937), St. Hallvards brønn  in Bragernes square in Drammen (1940–1952), Tvillingsøstrene (1947–1949) in Copenhagen, Evig liv (1948–1949) at Sehesteds plass in Oslo and Ung kvinne (1946–47) at St. Hanshaugen Park in Oslo, and Kongens Nei (1949–50) in Elverum.

Among his works were the identical bronze statues titles The Norwegian Lady  dedicated in 1962, which were placed in Moss, Norway and Virginia Beach, Virginia facing each other across the ocean. The statues were modeled after the figurehead of the Norwegian bark Dictator, home ported in Moss, which foundered and sank in the Graveyard of the Atlantic off the coast of Virginia Beach on 27–28 March 1891. Despite substantial lifesaving efforts from shore, seven persons died, including the captain's pregnant wife and four-year-old son. The new statues re-established old ties between the two communities, and in 1974, they became sister cities. Annual events are held at the Bast statues.

Selected works

Bronseløver, 1930–31
Borregaard-monumentet, 1936–39
St. Hallvards brønn, 1940–52
Ung kvinne, 1946–47
Tvillingsøstrene, 1947–49
Evig liv 1947–49
Stavernpiken, 1948–49
Kongens Nei, 1949–50
Fole, 1953,
Kristian Birkeland, 1960
The Norwegian Lady, 1962
Herman Wildenvey, 1965–67
Metamorfose av Nike fra Samothrake, 1966–67
Skogsarbeideren, 1967–68
Haakon VII, 1969
Einar Skjæraasen-monument, 1970
Pike med fugl, 1977

References

1907 births
1974 deaths
Norwegian resistance members
20th-century Norwegian painters
20th-century Norwegian sculptors
Recipients of the King's Medal of Merit in gold